is a subway station located in Shibuya, Tokyo, Japan. It is a part of the Tokyo Metro subway network, and is served by the Chiyoda Line and the Fukutoshin Line.

Harajuku Station on the Yamanote Line is immediately adjacent to Meiji-jingumae Station and is marked as an interchange on most route maps. Due to this proximity and to encourage use of the station by visitors, Tokyo Metro changed station signboards to read  on 6 March 2010.

Station layout

Platforms

History
The Chiyoda Line station opened on 20 October 1972; the Fukutoshin Line station opened on 14 June 2008.

The station facilities were inherited by Tokyo Metro after the privatization of the Teito Rapid Transit Authority (TRTA) in 2004.

PASMO smart card coverage at this station began operation on 18 March 2007.

Surrounding area
Points of interest include:
Meiji Shrine
Yoyogi Park
Yoyogi National Gymnasium
NHK Broadcasting Center

References

External links

 Meiji-jingumae Station (Tokyo Metro) 

Railway stations in Japan opened in 1972
Harajuku
Railway stations in Tokyo
Stations of Tokyo Metro
Tokyo Metro Chiyoda Line
Tokyo Metro Fukutoshin Line